Winston Roberts (born January 28, 1976) is an Antigua and Barbudan football player. He plays for Antigua and Barbuda national team.

National team statistics

International goals
Scores and results list Antigua and Barbuda's goal tally first.

References

External links

1976 births
Living people
Antigua and Barbuda footballers
Antigua and Barbuda international footballers
Association football midfielders